Montebello is a neighborhood in the borough of Ullern in Oslo, Norway. The area is dominated by single dwellings. The Norwegian Radium Hospital is located at Montebello. The area is served by Montebello Station on the Kolsås Line of the Oslo T-bane.

Neighbourhoods of Oslo